This discography lists the recordings Brian Wilson has released as a solo artist.

Albums

Studio albums

Live albums

Compilations

Singles

Sources: Billboard and Allmusic.com

Other appearances

Live appearances

Guest appearances

References

Discography
Discographies of American artists